The Wolf of Wall Street is a 2013 American biographical black comedy crime film directed by Martin Scorsese and written by Terence Winter, based on Jordan Belfort's 2007 memoir of the same name. It recounts Belfort's career as a stockbroker in New York City and how his firm, Stratton Oakmont, engaged in rampant corruption and fraud on Wall Street, leading to his downfall. Leonardo DiCaprio, who was also a producer of the film, stars as Belfort, with Jonah Hill as his business partner and friend Donnie Azoff, Margot Robbie as his second wife, Naomi Lapaglia, and Kyle Chandler as FBI agent Patrick Denham.

DiCaprio and Warner Bros. secured the rights to Belfort's memoir in 2007, with Scorsese set to direct, but content restrictions stalled production. The project was later greenlit by the independent production house Red Granite Pictures. Filming took place in late 2012 in New York City and was shot mostly on film stock.

The film premiered in New York City on December 17, 2013, and was released in the United States on December 25, 2013, by Paramount Pictures. It was the first major American film to be released exclusively through digital distribution. It was a major commercial success, grossing $406.9 million worldwide during its theatrical run, becoming Scorsese's highest-grossing film. The film was controversial for its moral ambiguity and lack of sympathy for victims, as well as explicit sexual content, extreme profanity, depiction of hard drug use, and use of animals during production. It set a Guinness World Record for the most instances of swearing in a film. The film's financing became implicated in the 1Malaysia Development Berhad corruption scandal; the U.S. Department of Justice and the Malaysian Anti-Corruption Commission investigated Red Granite Pictures, and producer Riza Aziz was arrested in 2019.

The film received positive reviews (and some moral censure) from critics and appeared on several "best of the year" lists. It was nominated for several awards, including five at the 86th Academy Awards ceremony: Best Picture, Best Director, Best Adapted Screenplay, Best Actor (for DiCaprio) and Best Supporting Actor (for Hill). DiCaprio won Best Actor – Musical or Comedy at the 71st Golden Globe Awards, where the film was also nominated for Best Picture – Musical or Comedy.

Plot
In 1987, Jordan Belfort lands a job as a Wall Street stockbroker for L.F. Rothschild, employed under Mark Hanna. He is quickly enticed by the drug-fueled stockbroker culture and Hanna's belief that a broker's only goal is to make money for himself. Jordan loses his job following Black Monday, the largest one-day stock market drop in history, and takes a job at a boiler room brokerage firm on Long Island that specializes in penny stocks. He makes a small fortune thanks to his aggressive pitching style and the high commissions.

Jordan befriends his neighbor Donnie Azoff, and the two found their own company. They recruit several of Jordan's friends, whom Jordan trains in the art of the "hard sell". Jordan's tactics and salesmanship largely contribute to the success of his pump and dump scheme, in which misleading, positive statements inflate a stock's price so it can be sold at an artificially high price. When the scheme's perpetrators sell their overvalued securities, the price plummets, and those who were conned into buying at the inflated price are left with stock that is suddenly worth much less than they paid. To cloak this, Jordan gives the firm the respectable-sounding name Stratton Oakmont in 1989.

After an exposé in Forbes, hundreds of ambitious young financiers flock to his company. Jordan becomes immensely successful and slides into a decadent lifestyle of prostitutes and drugs. He has an affair with a woman named Naomi Lapaglia; when his wife finds out, Jordan divorces her and marries Naomi in 1991. Meanwhile, the SEC and the FBI begin investigating Stratton Oakmont.

In 1993, Jordan illegally makes $22 million in three hours after securing the IPO of Steve Madden. This brings him and his firm further FBI attention. To hide his money, Jordan opens a Swiss bank account with corrupt banker Jean-Jacques Saurel in the name of Naomi's aunt Emma, who is a British subject and thus outside the immediate reach of American authorities. He uses the wife and in-laws of his friend Brad Bodnick, who have European passports, to smuggle the cash into Switzerland.

Donnie and Brad get into a heated argument in public during a money exchange, resulting in Brad's arrest, but Donnie escapes. Jordan learns from his private investigator that the FBI is wiretapping his phones. Fearing for his son, Jordan's father advises him to leave Stratton Oakmont and lie low while Jordan's lawyer negotiates a deal to keep him out of prison, but Jordan cannot bear to quit and talks himself into staying in the middle of his farewell speech.

In 1996, Jordan, Donnie, and their wives are on a yacht trip to Italy when they learn that Emma has died. Jordan proceeds to Switzerland to forge her name and save the account. To bypass border controls, he orders his yacht captain to sail to Monaco, but the ship capsizes in a storm. After their rescue, the plane sent to take them to Geneva is destroyed when a seagull flies into the engine; Jordan takes this as a sign from God to address his worsening drug addiction and attempts to sober up.

In 1998, the FBI arrests Jordan because Saurel, detained for an unrelated offense, has informed the FBI about Jordan. Since the evidence against him is overwhelming, Jordan agrees to gather evidence on his colleagues in exchange for leniency. Naomi tells Jordan she is divorcing him and wants full custody of their daughter and infant son. In a cocaine-fueled rage, Jordan hits Naomi and tries to drive away with his daughter but crashes his car in the driveway.

Later, Jordan wears a wire to work but slips a note to Donnie, warning him. The FBI discovers this, arrests Jordan, and raids and shuts down Stratton Oakmont. Despite breaching his deal, Jordan receives a reduced sentence of 36 months in a minimum security prison for his testimony and is released in 2000 after serving 22 months. After his release, Jordan makes a living hosting seminars on sales techniques.

Cast

Production

Development

In 2007, DiCaprio and Warner Bros. won a bidding war for the rights to Belfort's memoir The Wolf of Wall Street, with Belfort making $1 million off the deal. Having worked on the film's script, Scorsese was considered to direct the film but abandoned the project to work on Shutter Island (2010). He has said he "wasted five months of [his] life" without getting a green light on production dates from Warner Bros. In 2010, Warner Bros. offered the directorial role to Ridley Scott, with DiCaprio playing Belfort, but the studio eventually abandoned the project.

In 2012, the independent company Red Granite Pictures greenlit the project without content restrictions. Scorsese came back on board. Red Granite Pictures also asked Paramount Pictures to distribute the film; Paramount agreed to do so in North America and Japan, but passed on the rest of the international market. Universal Pictures acquired the international distribution rights.

According to Belfort, Random House asked him to tone down or excise the depictions of debauchery in his memoir before publication, especially those relating to his bachelor party, which featured zoophilia, and rampant use of drugs like nitrous oxide; neither the published memoir nor the film contains references to this.

In the film, most of the real-life characters' names have been changed from Belfort's original memoir. Donnie Azoff is based on Danny Porush. The name was changed after Porush threatened to sue the filmmakers. Porush maintains that much of the film is fictional and that Azoff is not an accurate depiction of him. Former Donna Karan Jeanswear CEO Elliot Lavigne does not appear in the film, but an incident recounted in the book, in which Belfort gives Lavigne mouth-to-mouth resuscitation to save him from choking to death, is similar to a scene in the film involving Donnie. The FBI agent Patrick Denham is the stand-in for real-life Gregory Coleman, and lawyer Manny Riskin is based on Ira Sorkin. Belfort's first wife, Denise Lombardo, is renamed Teresa Petrillo, and his second wife, Nadine Caridi, is Naomi Lapaglia on-screen. In contrast, Mark Hanna's name remains the same as the LF Rothschild stockbroker who, like Belfort, was convicted of fraud and served time in prison. Belfort's parents Max and Leah Belfort's names remained the same for the film. The role of Aunt Emma was initially offered to Julie Andrews, who refused it as she was recovering from an ankle injury, and was replaced by Joanna Lumley. In January 2014, Jonah Hill revealed in an interview with Howard Stern that he had made only $60,000 on the film (the lowest possible SAG-AFTRA rate for his amount of work), while DiCaprio (who also produced) received $10 million.

Filming

Filming began on August 8, 2012, in New York City. Hill announced on Twitter that his first day of shooting was September 4, 2012. Filming also took place in Closter, New Jersey, and Harrison, New York. Vitamin D powder was used as the fake substance for cocaine in the film; Hill was hospitalized with bronchitis due to snorting large quantities during filming.

Scorsese's longtime editor Thelma Schoonmaker, who has received seven Academy Award nominations for Best Film Editing, said the film would be shot digitally instead of on film. Scorsese had been a proponent of shooting on film, but decided to shoot Hugo digitally because it was being photographed in 3D. Despite being filmed in 2D, The Wolf of Wall Street was originally planned to be shot digitally. Schoonmaker expressed her disappointment with the decision: "It would appear that we've lost the battle. I think Marty just feels it's unfortunately over, and there's been no bigger champion of film than him." After extensive comparison tests during pre-production, eventually the majority of the film was shot on film stock, while scenes that used green screen effects or low light were shot with the digital Arri Alexa camera system. The film contains 400–450 VFX shots.

Profanity 
The film set a Guinness World Record for the most instances of swearing in a motion picture. It uses the word "fuck" 506 times, "cunt" thrice, "twat" twice, "fuckface" once, and "prick" four times, averaging 2.81 profanities per minute. The previous record holders were Scorsese's 1995 gangster film Casino, which had 422 uses of the word, and the 1997 British film Nil by Mouth, which had 428. The record has since been broken by Swearnet: The Movie, which uses the word 935 times.

The film's distributor in the United Arab Emirates cut 45 minutes of scenes of swearing, religious profanity, drug use, and sex, and "muted" dialogue containing expletives. The National reported that filmgoers in the UAE believed the film should not have been shown rather than being edited so heavily.

Release

Theatrical 
The Wolf of Wall Street premiered at the Ziegfeld Theatre in New York City on December 17, 2013, followed by a wide release on December 25. Its original release date of November 15 was pushed back after cuts were made to reduce the runtime. On October 22, it was reported that the film was set for release that Christmas. On October 29, Paramount officially confirmed that the film would release on Christmas Day, with a runtime of 165 minutes. This was changed to 180 minutes on November 25. It was officially rated R by the Motion Picture Association for "sequences of strong sexual content, graphic nudity, drug use and language throughout, and for some violence". In the UK, the film received an 18 certificate from the British Board of Film Classification for "very strong language, strong sex [and] hard drug use".

The film is banned in Kenya, Malaysia, Nepal, and Zimbabwe because of its scenes depicting sex and drugs and excessive profanity, and additional scenes have been cut in the versions playing in India. In Singapore, after cuts were made to an orgy scene as well as some religiously profane or denigrating language, the film was passed R21.

The release of The Wolf of Wall Street marked a shift in cinema history when Paramount became the first major studio to distribute movies to theaters exclusively in a digital format, eliminating 35mm film entirely. Anchorman 2: The Legend Continues was the last Paramount production to include a 35mm film version.

Home media 
The Wolf of Wall Street was released on DVD and Blu-ray on March 25, 2014. On January 27, 2014, it was announced that a four-hour director's cut would be attached to the home release. Paramount Pictures and Red Granite Pictures later announced that the home release would feature only the theatrical release. A 4K Ultra HD Blu-ray was released on December 14, 2021.

Reception

Box office 
The Wolf of Wall Street grossed $116.9 million in North America and $289 million internationally, for a total of $406.9 million, making it Scorsese's highest-grossing film worldwide. In North America, the film opened at number five in its first weekend, with $19.4 million in 3,387 theaters, behind The Hobbit: The Desolation of Smaug, Frozen, Anchorman 2: The Legend Continues, and American Hustle. In Australia, it is the highest grossing R-rated film, earning $12.96 million.

Critical response 
On Rotten Tomatoes, The Wolf of Wall Street holds an approval rating of 80% based on 289 reviews and an average rating of 7.80/10. The site's critical consensus reads, "Funny, self-referential, and irreverent to a fault, The Wolf of Wall Street finds Martin Scorsese and Leonardo DiCaprio at their most infectiously dynamic." On Metacritic, the film has a weighted average score of 75 out of 100 based on 47 reviews, indicating "generally favorable reviews".

Peter Travers of Rolling Stone magazine named The Wolf of Wall Street the third-best film of 2013, behind 12 Years a Slave and Gravity. Mick LaSalle of the San Francisco Chronicle wrote, "it is the best and most enjoyable American film to be released this year." Richard Brody of The New Yorker called the film "Olympian", saying that if it was Scorsese's last film it "would rank among the most harshly awe-inspiring farewells of the cinema." The Chicago Sun-Times's Richard Roeper gave the film a B+, calling it "good, not great Scorsese".

Dana Stevens of Slate was more critical, calling the film "epic in size, claustrophobically narrow in scope." Marshall Fine of The Huffington Post argued that the story "wants us to be interested in characters who are dull people to start with, made duller by their delusions of being interesting because they are high". Some critics viewed the film as an irresponsible glorification of Belfort and his associates rather than a satirical takedown. DiCaprio defended the film, arguing that it does not glorify the excessive lifestyle it depicts.

In 2016, the film was ranked #78 on the BBC's 100 Greatest Films of the 21st Century list. In 2017, Richard Brody named The Wolf of Wall Street the second-best film of the 21st century so far, behind Jean-Luc Godard's In Praise of Love. In 2019, Brody named The Wolf of Wall Street the best film of the 2010s.

Audience response 
The film received an average grade of C on an A+ to F scale from audiences surveyed by CinemaScore, the lowest rating of any film opening that week. The Los Angeles Times argues that the film attracted conservative viewers because its marketing had a more moralistic tone than the film.

Christina McDowell, daughter of Tom Prousalis, who worked closely with Belfort at Stratton Oakmont, wrote an open letter to Scorsese, DiCaprio, and Belfort, criticizing the film for insufficiently portraying the victims of Stratton Oakmont's financial crimes, disregarding the damage done to her family as a result, and giving celebrity status to people (Belfort and his partners, including her father) who do not deserve it.

Steven Perlberg of Business Insider saw an advance screening of the film at a Regal Cinemas near the Goldman Sachs building with an audience of finance workers. Perlberg reported cheers from the audience at what he considered all the wrong moments, writing, "When Belfort—a drug addict attempting to remain sober—rips up a couch cushion to get to his secret coke stash, there were cheers."

Former Assistant United States Attorney Joel M. Cohen, who prosecuted Belfort, criticized both the film and the book on which it is based. He said that he believes some of Belfort's claims were "invented": for instance, Belfort "aggrandized his importance and reverence for him by others at his firm." He strongly criticized the film for not depicting the "thousands of victims who lost hundreds of millions of dollars", not accepting the filmmakers' argument that it would have diverted attention from the wrongdoers. He deplored the ending—"beyond an insult" to Belfort's victims—in which the real Belfort appears, while showing "a large sign advertising the name of Mr. Belfort's real motivational speaking company", and a positive depiction of Belfort uttering "variants of the same falsehoods he trained others to use against his victims".

Top ten lists
The Wolf of Wall Street was listed on many critics' top ten lists for films released in 2013, and was chosen as one of the top ten films of the year by the American Film Institute. Metacritic analysis found the film was the ninth-most mentioned film on "best of the year" film rankings and the 22nd-most mentioned on "best of the decade" film rankings.

 1st – Sasha Stone, Awards Daily
 1st – Stephen Schaefer, Boston Herald
 1st – Richard Brody, The New Yorker (tied with To the Wonder)

 2nd – Wesley Morris, Grantland
 2nd – Mick LaSalle, San Francisco Chronicle
 2nd – Ben Kenigsberg, The A.V. Club

 3rd – James Berardinelli, Reelviews
 3rd – MTV
 3rd – Glenn Kenny, RogerEbert.com
 3rd – Peter Travers, Rolling Stone

 4th – Scott Feinberg, The Hollywood Reporter
 4th – Drew McWeeny, HitFix
 4th – Yahoo! Movies
 4th – Christopher Orr, The Atlantic
 4th – Barbara Vancheri, Pittsburgh Post-Gazette

 5th – Caryn James, Indiewire
 5th – Stephen Holden, The New York Times
 5th – Rex Reed, The New York Observer
 5th – Katey Rich, Vanity Fair
 5th – David Chen, /Film

 6th – TV Guide

 7th – Matt Zoller Seitz, RogerEbert.com
 7th – Film School Rejects
 7th – Todd McCarthy, The Hollywood Reporter
 7th – Scott Tobias, The Dissolve
 7th – Scott Mantz, Access Hollywood
 7th – Mark Mohan, The Oregonian
 7th – Sam Adams, The A.V. Club

 8th – Nathan Rabin, The Dissolve
 8th – Bill Goodykoontz, Arizona Republic
 8th – Randy Myers, San Jose Mercury News

 9th – Joe Neumaier, New York Daily News

 10th – Andrew O'Hehir, Salon.com
 10th – Jessica Kiang and Katie Walsh, Indiewire
 10th – A.O. Scott, The New York Times
 10th – Rene Rodriguez, Miami Herald
 10th – Marjorie Baumgarten, Austin Chronicle
 10th – Keith Uhlich, Time Out New York

 Top 10 – (unranked top 10 lists) 
 Top 10 – James Verniere, Boston Herald
 Top 10 – Stephen Whitty, The Star-Ledger
 Top 10 – Joe Williams, St. Louis Post-Dispatch

Controversies

Use of animals
The Wolf of Wall Street uses animals, including a chimpanzee, a lion, a snake, a fish, and dogs. The chimpanzee and the lion were provided by the Big Cat Habitat wildlife sanctuary in Sarasota County, Florida. The four-year-old chimpanzee Chance spent time with DiCaprio and learned to roller skate in three weeks. The sanctuary also provided a lion named Handsome because the trading company depicted in the film used a lion as its symbol. Danny Porush denied that there were any animals in the office, although he admitted to eating an employee's goldfish.

In December 2013, before the film premiered, the organization Friends of Animals criticized the use of the chimpanzee and organized a boycott of the film. Variety reported, "Friends of Animals thinks the chimp... suffered irreversible psychological damage after being forced to act." The Guardian commented on the increasing criticism of Hollywood's use of animals, writing, "The Wolf of Wall Street'''s use of a chimpanzee arrives as Hollywood comes under ever-increasing scrutiny for its employment of animals on screen". PETA also launched a campaign to highlight mistreatment of ape "actors" and to petition for DiCaprio not to work with great apes.

1MDB scandal

In 2015, Red Granite Pictures and the film's financing became implicated in the 1Malaysia Development Berhad scandal, a major international corruption scandal that began in Malaysia. The Malaysian Anti-Corruption Commission (MACC) alleged the film was financed by money producer Riza Aziz stole from the Malaysian 1Malaysia Development Berhad (1MDB) sovereign wealth fund. Aziz is the stepson of then-Malaysian Prime Minister Najib Razak. Aziz was arrested in connection with the scandal and pleaded not guilty to money laundering charges in July 2019. According to court filings, a company owned by fugitive businessman Jho Low gave the film's producers a $9 million advance. Low was given a "special thanks" in the film's credits.

The film is part of a broader investigation into these illicit monetary movements, and in 2016 was named in a series of civil complaints the United States Department of Justice filed "for having provided a trust account through which hundreds of millions of dollars belonging to the 1MDB fund were illicitly siphoned". To settle the civil lawsuit, Red Granite Pictures agreed to pay the U.S. government $60 million with no "admission of wrongdoing or liability on the part of Red Granite". This settlement was part of a more expansive U.S. effort to seize approximately $1.7 billion in assets allegedly purchased with funds embezzled from 1MDB. In January 2020, Belfort sued Red Granite for $300 million, also wishing to void his rights deal; he said that he would never have sold the rights to Red Granite if he had known how the film was being financed.

Thematic controversy and debate
Various people have criticized the film as materialistic, encouraging greedy behavior, extreme wealth, and advocating for the infamous individuals portrayed in the film. Christina McDowell, whose father, Tom Prousalis, worked in association with Belfort, accused the filmmakers of "exacerbating our national obsession with wealth and status and glorifying greed and psychopathic behavior". She emphasized the gravity and significance of Belfort's crimes, saying that Wolf of Wall Street is a "reckless attempt at continuing to pretend that these sorts of schemes are entertaining, even as the country is reeling from yet another round of Wall Street scandals".

After DiCaprio defended himself from criticism, Variety journalist Whitney Friedlander called the film "three hours of cash, drugs, hookers, repeat" and argued that the film is a "celebration of this lifestyle" and implies that short-lived extreme wealth and extraordinary experiences are superior to normal behavior.

Nikole TenBrink, vice president of marketing and membership at Risk and Insurance Management Society, has said the film is a "cautionary tale of what can happen when fraud is left unchecked". She describes Belfort's business acumen, his talent in communicating and selling his ideas, and his ability to motivate others as offering "valuable lessons for risk professionals as they seek to avoid similar pitfalls".

Belfort's reaction
Belfort said of the film's depiction of himself and Stratton Oakmont that it did an excellent job at describing the "overall feeling" of those years, adding, "the camaraderie, the insanity, that was accurate". Of his drug use, Belfort said that his actual habits were "much worse" than is depicted in the film and that he was "on 22 different drugs at the end".

Belfort also analyzed the inaccuracies in the film's oversimplification of Stratton Oakmont's gradual transition from advocating for "speculative stocks" in order to "help build America" to committing crimes. He said he "didn't like hearing" overly simplified and blunt depictions of his crimes because "it made me look like I was just trying to rip people off". But Belfort did acknowledge the cinematic benefits of these oversimplifications as "a very easy way in three hours" to "move the audience emotionally".

 Nadine Maculoso's reaction 
On September 28, 2022, Nadine Maculoso, Belfort's ex-wife on whom the character Naomi was based, said that the depiction of Belfort and their relationship was accurate and that she hopes to educate people on signs of domestic abuse and toxic relationships.

 Accolades 

The film was nominated for five Academy Awards: Best Picture, Best Director for Scorsese, Best Adapted Screenplay for Winter, Best Actor for DiCaprio, and Best Supporting Actor for Hill. It was also nominated for four BAFTAs, including Best Director, Best Actor and Best Adapted Screenplay, and two Golden Globe Awards, including Best Motion Picture – Musical or Comedy. DiCaprio won the Golden Globe Award for Best Actor – Motion Picture Musical or Comedy.

 Soundtrack 

The film's soundtrack features both original and preexisting music tracks. It was released on December 17, 2013, for digital download. More than 60 songs are used in the film, but only 16 are on the official soundtrack. Among the notable exceptions are original compositions by Theodore Shapiro.

 See also 
 The Wolf of Wall Street (1929 film)
 Scam 1992 The Big Bull''
 Boiler Room (film)
 Gordon Gekko
 Microcap stock fraud
 List of films that most frequently use the word "fuck"

References

External links 

 
 
 
 
 
 Paramount Movies – Wolf of Wall Street

2013 films
2013 black comedy films
2010s American films
2010s English-language films
2010s biographical films
2010s business films
2010s legal films
American black comedy films
American business films
American legal films
Appian Way Productions films
Biographical films about businesspeople
Biographical films about fraudsters
Comedy films based on actual events
Cultural depictions of American men
Cultural depictions of businesspeople
Cultural depictions of fraudsters
Fiction with unreliable narrators
Fictional portrayals of the New York City Police Department
Films about con artists
Films about drugs
Films about father–son relationships
Films about financial crises
Films about narcissism
Films about the Federal Bureau of Investigation
Films about the New York City Police Department
Films about the upper class
Films banned in Nepal
Films based on non-fiction books
Films directed by Martin Scorsese
Films featuring a Best Musical or Comedy Actor Golden Globe winning performance
Films produced by Leonardo DiCaprio
Films produced by Martin Scorsese
Films set in 1987
Films set in 1989
Films set in 1991
Films set in 1993
Films set in 1996
Films set in 1998
Films set in Geneva
Films set in Italy
Films set in London
Films set in New York City
Films set in New Zealand
Films set in Switzerland
Films set in the 1990s
Films set in the Las Vegas Valley
Films shot in New Jersey
Films shot in New York (state)
Films shot in New York City
Paramount Pictures films
Red Granite Pictures films
Self-reflexive films
Trading films
Film and television memes
Internet memes
Universal Pictures films
Film controversies
Wall Street films
Works subject to a lawsuit
Film controversies in Malaysia